Green Lakes can refer to one of the following:

 Green (Žalieji) Lakes north of Vilnius in Lithuania
 "Green Lakes" towers in Dubai, United Arab Emirates
 Green Lakes State Park, a state park in central New York